Platismatia regenerans is a species of corticolous (bark-dwelling), foliose lichen in the family Parmeliaceae. Found in Borneo, it was formally described as a new species in 1968 by William and Chicita Culberson. The species epithet refers to the "regenerative lobulae" that occur on older parts of the thallus.

References

Parmeliaceae
Lichen species
Lichens described in 1968
Taxa named by William Louis Culberson
Taxa named by Chicita F. Culberson
Lichens of Malesia